Outburst Queer Arts Festival Belfast is Northern Ireland's annual queer arts festival. It features ten days of theatre, film, music, literature, visual art, discussion and debate from both local and international LGBT artists and performers.

Festivals

2007

2008

2009

See also
Belfast Pride Festival 
Black Box Belfast

References
Outburst Arts Website 
Belfast Telegraph, 5 November 2008, 'Queer’ arts festival' 
Belfast City Council Events 2009

LGBT organisations in Northern Ireland
Arts festivals in Northern Ireland
LGBT festivals in the United Kingdom
LGBT film festivals in the United Kingdom
Annual events in Northern Ireland
Festivals in Belfast
LGBT arts organizations
Autumn events in Northern Ireland
LGBT literary festivals